Maxillariinae is an orchid subtribe in the tribe Cymbidieae. It was formerly treated as the tribe Maxillarieae, and divided into a number of subtribes.

Genera
Generic boundaries in the tribe have changed substantially with new molecular evidence. Whitten et al. in 2007 included the following genera, some previously placed in the tribe Lycastinae, others in the subtribe Bifrenariinae. Some of these genera have subsequently been merged. 
Anguloa Ruiz & Pav.
Anthosiphon Schltr. – since included in Maxillaria
Bifrenaria Lindl. (including Adipe Raf., Cydoniorchis Senghas, and Stenocoryne Lindl.)
Brasiliorchis R.Singer, S.Koehler & Carnevali
Chrysocycnis Linden & Rchb.f. – since included in Maxillaria
Cryptocentrum Benth.
Cyrtidiorchis Rauschert
Guanchezia G.A.Romero & Carnevali
Horvatia Garay
Hylaeorchis Carnevali & G.A. Romero
Ida A.Ryan & Oakeley – since included in Sudamerlycaste
Lycaste Lindl.
Maxillaria Ruiz & Pavón
Mormolyca Fenzl
Neomoorea Rolfe
Pityphyllum Schltr.
Rudolfiella Hoehne
Scuticaria Lindl.
Sudamerlycaste Archila
Teuscheria Garay
Trigonidium Lindl. 
Xylobium Lindl.

See also 
 Taxonomy of the Orchidaceae

References

Bibliography

External links 

 
Orchid subtribes
Taxa named by George Bentham